Compsolechia refracta is a moth of the family Gelechiidae. It was described by Edward Meyrick in 1914. It is found in Guyana, Peru and Brazil.

The wingspan is 12–13 mm. The forewings are dark brown with four very obscure violet-fuscous direct transverse fasciae, the first moderate and subbasal, the second broad and antemedian, the third very broad and postmedian and the fourth from four-fifths of the costa to the tornus, sometimes slightly incurved, narrow and posteriorly suffused. There is a small obscure spot of ground colour in the third representing the second discal stigma. The hindwings are dark fuscous.

References

Moths described in 1914
Compsolechia
Taxa named by Edward Meyrick